Farlowella nattereri is a species of armored catfish of the family native to Bolivia, Brazil, Colombia, Ecuador, Guyana and Peru.  It occurs in the upper Essequibo and Amazon basins.  This species grows to a length of  SL.

References 
 

nattereri
Catfish of South America
Fish of Bolivia
Freshwater fish of Brazil
Freshwater fish of Colombia
Fish of Ecuador
Vertebrates of Guyana
Fish of Peru
Fish described in 1910